Ynys was a railway station opened in 1872 by the LNWR next to a level crossing in a small hamlet north of Criccieth, Gwynedd. It closed in December 1964 as recommended in the Beeching Report.

References

Sources

Further material

External links
 The station site on a navigable OS Map National Library of Scotland
 The station and line Rail Map Online
 The line CNV with mileages Railway Codes
 Images of the station Yahoo
 The station and line LNWR Society
 By DMU from Pwllheli to Amlwch Huntley Archives

Beeching closures in Wales
Disused railway stations in Gwynedd
Llanystumdwy
Railway stations in Great Britain opened in 1872
Railway stations in Great Britain closed in 1964
Former London and North Western Railway stations